The Persian Gulf is home to many islands, mostly small, distributed in the gulf's entire geographic area and administered by the neighboring nations. Most islands are sparsely populated, with some being barren, and some utilized for communication, military, or as ship docks. Some of the islands in the Persian Gulf are artificially constructed islands. The artificial islands often serve as tourist resorts, housing developments, or hotels. Despite their small sizes, some of these artificial islands have caused serious hazards for the already fragile ecosystem of the Gulf and its dwindling wildlife mass. A few of the Gulf islands are also historically significant, having been utilized by the ancient empires, neighboring kingdoms, and in the recent times, colonial powers such as the British empire, and the Portuguese empire. Recent globalization, and discovery of oil, has made some of the Persian Gulf islands very significant for developed nations as a source of oil and raw industrial material. Recent wars, and political unrest has also made these islands strategic military locations for foreign powers from America and Europe.

Some islands in the Persian Gulf are nations themselves; Bahrain, an independent Gulf state, is the only gulf country that is also an island.

Bahrain
 Amwaj Islands
 Bahrain Island
 Hawar Islands
 Jidda Island
 Muharraq Island
 Nabih Saleh
 Sitra
 Umm an Nasan
 Umm as Sabaan

Iran
 Abbasak Island (Shah Zendegi)
 Abu Musa 
 Buneh Island
 Cheraghi Island
 Dara Island
 Farsi Island
 Forur Bozorg Island (Polour)
 Forur Koochak Island (Forurgan)
 Greater Tunb – claimed by Emirate of Ras al-Khaimah, United Arab Emirates.
 Lesser Tunb – claimed by Emirate of Ras al-Khaimah, United Arab Emirates.
 Hendurabi Island
 Hengam Island 
 Hormuz Island
 Jonobi Island (Mir Mohna Island)
 Kharg Island (Khark)
 Kharku Island
 Kish Island
 Larak Island
 Lavan Island
 Minu Island
 Morghi Island
 Motaff Island
 Mouliaat Island
 Naaz Islands
 Nakhiloo Island
 Negin Island
 Om e Sile Island (Khan)
 Ommolkorm Island (Gorm)
 Qabre Nakhoda Island
 Qeshm Island
 Rostam Island (Reshadat oil field platform)
 Sadra Island
 SeDandon Island
 Sheykh Andarabi Island
 Shidvar Island
 Shif Island
 Sirri Island
 Tahmadu Island (Jabrin)

Kuwait
 Auhah Island
 Bubiyan Island
 Failaka Island
 Kubbar Island
 Miskan Island
 Qaruh Island
 Umm al Maradim Island
 Umm an Namil Island
 Warbah Island
  Green Island

Saudi Arabia
 Arabia Island
 Tarout Island
 Huwaisat Island
Mashaab Island
Paradise Island
Muslimyah Island
Qumairi Island
Jana Island
Grid Island
Crane Island
Couscous island
Al Bayna Island
Abu Ali Island
Darien Island

United Arab Emirates
 Daiyina
 Das
 Dalma
 Arzanah
 Al Qaffāy
 Sir Abu Nu’ayr
 Zirku Island

References

Persian Gulf